The Serbia men's national under-20 basketball team is the men's basketball team, administered by Basketball Federation of Serbia, that represents Serbia in international under-20 (under age 20) men's basketball competitions, consisting mainly of the FIBA Europe Under-20 Championship. The event was originally referred to as the European Championship for Men '22 and Under' and the 2000 European Championship for Young Men.

The national team competed as FR Yugoslavia up to 2002, and as Serbia and Montenegro from 2004 to 2006.

History

1992–2006: Serbia and Montenegro

2007 onwards: Serbia

Individual awards 

 Most Valuable Player
 Igor Rakočević – 1998
 Miloš Teodosić – 2007
 Miroslav Raduljica – 2008
 Marko Gudurić – 2015
 Mihailo Bošković – 2022 (Division B)
 All-Tournament Team
 Ivan Koljević – 2004
 Luka Bogdanović – 2005
 Nikola Peković – 2006
 Dragan Labović – 2007
 Miloš Teodosić – 2007
 Miroslav Raduljica – 2008
 Nikola Janković – 2014
 Marko Gudurić – 2015
 Nikola Rebić – 2015
 Mihailo Bošković – 2022 (Division B)

 Statistical leaders: Points
 Igor Rakočević – 1998
 Statistical leaders: Assists
 Miloš Teodosić – 2007
 Statistical leaders: Rebounds
 Nenad Krstić – 2002
 Miroslav Raduljica – 2008

Competitive record

Representing Yugoslavia / Serbia and Montenegro

Representing Serbia 

Division A

Division B
After finished 15th at the 2019 Division A Championship, the team was relegated to Division B.

Coaches

Yugoslavia / Serbia and Montenegro

Serbia

Past rosters

Representing Yugoslavia / Serbia and Montenegro

Representing Serbia

See also 
 Serbia women's national under-20 basketball team
 Serbian men's university basketball team
 Serbia men's national under-19 basketball team
 Serbia men's national under-18 basketball team
 Serbia men's national under-17 basketball team
 Serbia men's national under-16 basketball team
 Yugoslavia men's national under-21 basketball team

Notes

References

External links
 Basketball Federation of Serbia
 FIBA Europe

M U20
Men's national under-20 basketball teams